Chinese pair Yu Xin-yuan and Zeng Shao-Xuan was the defenders of title; however, they didn't start this year.
Miguel Ángel López Jaén and Pere Riba became the new champions, after their won against Gianluca Naso and Walter Trusendi in the final.

Seeds

Draw

Draw

References
 Doubles Draw

Camparini Gioielli Cup - Doubles
Camparini Gioielli Cup